Sheykh Serjin (also Romanized as Sheykh Serjīn) is a village in Molla Yaqub Rural District, in the Central District of Sarab County, East Azerbaijan Province, Iran. As of the 2006 census, its population was 216, in 38 families.

References 

Populated places in Sarab County